Taiwanese entertainer Jolin Tsai has appeared in 185 music videos, 33 video albums, and four video singles. In 1999, she released her first music video of "I Know You're Feeling Blue". In 2000, she released her first concert video, 1019 I Can Concert and her first music video compilation, Don't Stop. In 2001, she released her second concert video, Show Your Love Concert and her second music video compilation, Show Your Love. In 2002, she released her third music video compilation, Lucky Number.

In 2005, she released her third concert video, J1 Live Concert. In 2007, she released her first documentary video, If You Think You Can, You Can!. In 2009, she released her fourth concert video, Love & Live. In 2013, she released her fifth concert video, Myself World Tour. In 2018, she released her sixth concert video, Play World Tour.

Music videos

1990s

2000s

2010s

2020s

Cameo appearances

Video albums

Video singles

References

External links 
 

Videography
Music videographies